Zodarion blagoevi is a spider species found in Bulgaria and Greece.

See also
 List of Zodariidae species

References

External links

blagoevi
Fauna of Bulgaria
Fauna of Greece
Spiders of Europe
Spiders described in 2009